Glossogobius hoesei, Hoese's goby, is a species of goby endemic to the Ayamaru Lakes in West Papua, Indonesia where it can be found on muddy or gravel substrates as well as in small tributary streams.  This species can reach a length of  SL. The specific name honours the ichthyologist Douglass Fielding Hoese of the Australian Museum in Sydney who has made an important contribution to the study of fishes in the order Gobiiformes.

References

hoesei
Freshwater fish of Western New Guinea
Taxonomy articles created by Polbot
Fish described in 1982